Luiz Alves Rocha is the Curator and Follett Chair of Ichthyology at the California Academy of Sciences. He is also an adjunct professor at the University of California Santa Cruz and San Francisco State University.

Education 
Rocha has obtained a PhD in Fisheries and Aquatic Sciences from the University of Florida, and a BS in Biology and Masters in Zoology from the Federal University of Paraiba in Brazil. He also conducted post-doctoral work at the Smithsonian Tropical Research Institute and the University of Hawaii.

Career 
Rocha has authored one book and more than 150 scientific articles. He is best known for his work in speciation in coral reef fishes using advanced genomic methodologies to understand fish evolution, and more recently has been actively exploring the diversity of deep (mesophotic) coral reefs throughout the tropics. 

He has also published an opinion piece in the New York Times about the problems associated with the creation of large marine protected areas in the open ocean, and has evaluated the conservation status of hundreds of species for the IUCN Red List, including the endangered Social Wrasse.

Taxon named in his honor 
The Parrotfish Sparisoma rocha Pinheiro, Gasparini & I. Sazima, 2010 and 
The Sweeper fish Rocha's sweeper Pempheris rochai J. E. Randall & Victor, 2015 were named in Rocha's honor for his contributions to ichthyology.

Honors and awards 
In 2019 he won the inaugural Margaret M. Stewart Achievement Award for Excellence in Ichthyology or Herpetology for his scientific contributions and scholarly impacts on the field of ichthyology.

Taxon described by him
See :Category:Taxa named by Luiz A. Rocha

References

Evolutionary biologists
American ichthyologists
People associated with the California Academy of Sciences
Living people
Year of birth missing (living people)
University of Florida alumni
Brazilian ichthyologists